Moshe Atzmon (born 30 July 1931) is an Israeli conductor.

He was born Móse Grószberger in Budapest, and at the age of thirteen he emigrated with his family to Tel Aviv, Israel.  He started his musical career on the horn before going to London for further studies in conducting.

He has won several conducting prizes and held many positions with major orchestras. He was chief conductor of the Sydney Symphony Orchestra from 1967 to 1971 and the Basel Symphony Orchestra from 1972 to 1986. He was chief conductor of orchestras in Tokyo, Nagoya, and Rennes and of the Dortmunder Philharmoniker.

External links
 Moshe Atzmon biography at DaCapo Records webpage
 Moshe Atzmon biography 

1931 births
Living people
Israeli conductors (music)
Hungarian conductors (music)
Male conductors (music)
Jewish classical musicians
Israeli Jews
Hungarian Jews
Hungarian emigrants to Mandatory Palestine
Israeli people of Hungarian-Jewish descent
Musicians from Budapest
People from Tel Aviv
21st-century conductors (music)
21st-century Hungarian male musicians